Arthur Douglas Hair was founder of the Last Post Fund in 1909. One of Hair's military brothers, James Daly, died without family or the means to have a proper funeral. Hair was "outraged by the callous disregard for the deceased man's past military service".  Hair wrote a letter to The Gazette and went on a mission to ensure that the military dead "no matter what their lot in life, were worthy of more reverential treatment".  Now The Last Post Fund provides military men and their spouses with a dignified funeral and burial within more than 2,000 cemeteries across Canada and at its own military cemetery, the National Field of Honour in Pointe-Claire, Quebec, where some 20,000 military and close ones are buried.

References

Canadian activists